Jurjen van der Kooi (Hurdegaryp, 22 December 1943 – Drachten, 4 September 2018) was a Dutch university lecturer and folklorist from Frisia. He was widely recognized as an authority in the field of folk tales from Frisia, Northern Netherlands and parts of northern Germany.

Life and career
Van der Kooi was born in 1943 in Hurdegaryp. He studied literature and until his retirement in 2004 was head lecturer and associate professor of folklore and oral literature at the University of Groningen. In that capacity he was also active as a scientific researcher of folk tales from the Northern Netherlands, Eastern Netherlands and parts of northern Germany.

In 1984, he obtained his doctorate cum laude on Volksverhalen in Friesland: Lectuur en Mondelinge Overlevering. The central point of that thesis was Van der Kooi's statement that many folktales in Frisia have not been handed down from parent to parent for centuries, but actually often go back to (written) publications from the nineteenth century that have been handed down in retold form.

His most important insight was the collection and categorization of folk tales, folk rhymes and proverbs from Northern Netherlands, East Friesland and North Friesland. Van der Kooi considered folktales as a common cultural asset, from which it can be deduced how people used to live and how society has developed over the years.

Van der Kooi wrote many publications, including De Nachtmerje van Rawier, in which he brought together a number of Frisian legends about the supernatural, and De Wiete Poes, in which together with  he compiled a series of wild folk tales collected in which were omitted from most other books. Van der Kooi died in Drachten in 2018, at the age of 74.

Works
 1984 – Volksverhalen in Friesland: Lectuur en Mondelinge Overlevering (Dissertation)
 1990 – Dialectliteratuur
 1990 – Friesische Märchen (with B.A. Gezelle Meerburg)
 1994 – Friesische Sagen (1994)
 1996 – Spiegel van Groningen (P.Th.F.M. Boekholt)
 1997 – Untank Is it Lean fan 'e Wrâld: Folksferhalen op Rym
 1998 – Der Ring im Fischbauch 
 2000 – De Nachtmerje fan Rawier 
 2001 – Dizionario delle fiabe e delle favole (with T. Dekker en T. Meder) 
 2003 – Van Janmaanje en Keudeldoemke 
 2003 – Die Frau die verlorenging. Sagen aus Ostfriesland (with T. Schuster) 
 2007 – Alle Beetjes Helpen: Nederlandse, Friese en Vlaamse Wellerismen (with H.L. Cox e.o.)
 2011 – De Herder Is Myn Redder
 2017 – De Wiete Poes (with Douwe Kootstra)

Sources 
――, Volksverhalenexpert Van der Kooi overleden, in: Leeuwarder Courant, 10 September 2018, p. 28.

1943 births
2018 deaths
Dutch folklorists
People from Tytsjerksteradiel